There were two general elections held in the United Kingdom in 1974:

February 1974 United Kingdom general election
October 1974 United Kingdom general election